Alver Mathias "Ollie Rocco" Reinikka (August 2, 1901 – November 2, 1962) was a Canadian professional ice hockey forward. In the 1926–27 season, he played 16 games in the National Hockey League for the New York Rangers. Reinikka was born in Shuswap, British Columbia, but grew up in Canmore, Alberta.

Playing career
Prior to his short stint with the Rangers Ollie Reinikka played with the Vancouver Maroons of the WCHL.

Reinikka, of Finnish descent, picked up the nickname of "Ollie Rocco" while playing with the New York Rangers. The Madison Square Garden publicity department team of Bruno and Blythe gave nicknames  intended to help attract more diverse audiences to games, in this case, Italian.

Career statistics

Regular season and playoffs

References

External links

1901 births
1962 deaths
Canadian ice hockey centres
Canadian people of Finnish descent
Hamilton Tigers (CPHL) players
Ice hockey people from Alberta
London Tecumsehs players
New York Rangers players
People from Canmore, Alberta
Seattle Eskimos players
Springfield Indians players
Stratford Nationals players
Vancouver Maroons players